Lufthansa may refer to the following:

Airlines and related firms 
Deutsche Luft Hansa, former national airline of Germany (1926–1945)
Deutsche Lufthansa, former national airline of East Germany (1955–1963)
Lufthansa, the current German flag carrier airline founded in 1953.
Lufthansa Cargo, a German cargo airline and wholly owned subsidiary.
Lufthansa Consulting, a subsidiary providing consulting services to the aviation industry.
Lufthansa Flight Training, a subsidiary that trains Lufthansa pilots.
Lufthansa Italia, former Italian airline and wholly owned subsidiary (2009–2011)
Lufthansa Regional, brand name for two regional airlines owned by Lufthansa.
Lufthansa CityLine, one of the regional partner airlines.
Lufthansa Systems, an information technology service provider for the aviation industry. 
Lufthansa Technik, a group of 32 companies providing aircraft services.
Team Lufthansa, former name of Lufthansa Regional (1996–2004)
Lufthansa Airport Express, a former train service to Frankfurt airport (1982–1993)

Places
Lufthansa Center, a building complex in Beijing, China.

Sports
Lufthansa Cup, former name of the German Open (WTA) (1989–1992)
Lufthansa SG Berlin, former football club of Lufthansa employees (1931–1945)